Chris Hesse may refer to:

 Chris Hesse (musician), drummer with Hoobastank
 Chris Tsui Hesse (born 1932), Ghanaian cinematographer and filmmaker